The Case of the Bloody Iris (Italian: Perché quelle strane gocce di sangue sul corpo di Jennifer?, lit. "Why those strange drops of blood on Jennifer's body?", originally released in the UK as Erotic Blue) is a 1972 Italian giallo film directed by Giuliano Carnimeo, identified in the credits as Anthony Ascott. The film was referred to as "never boring" and "a competent thriller which offers enough violence and sex to satisfy the most ardent giallo fan".

In 2015, a novelization of the film by Michael R. Hudson was published in the United States by Raven Head Press as part of a series of adaptations of several of Gastaldi's scripts, including The Horrible Dr. Hichcock and My Name is Nobody.

Plot   
A prostitute, Luna, is buzzed into the high-rise apartment building of a potential client. She is stabbed to death in the elevator by a masked killer who vanishes before it reaches the top floor, where the tenants (Professor Issacs, widow Mrs. Moss, and casino stripper Mizar Harrington) discover the body. The police are called as Mizar leaves for her shift at the casino.

Meanwhile, the building’s architect Andrea Antinori hires a photographer, Arthur, to find models for advertisements. He  becomes enthralled with Jennifer Langsbury, who is posing with her model friend Marilyn Ricci. On her way out of the studio, Jennifer is accosted by Adam, the leader of a cult named “Iris” she was a part of before escaping into modeling. He sternly warns her if she doesn’t come back to him, there will be consequences.

Mizar returns to her apartment, where she is drowned in the bathtub by the killer. In the morning, police commissioners Enci and Renzi investigate the murder. Mrs. Moss is interviewed as a witness. At the crime scene, a love letter is found.

To entice them to star in his advertisements, Andrea sublets Mizar’s now-vacant apartment to Jennifer and Marilyn. He joins them for dinner and is disturbed by the sight of Jennifer cutting her finger, revealing his blood phobia. On his way out of the building afterwards, Andrea is confronted by Adam, who tells him Jennifer can’t belong to anyone else.

Close to dawn, the killer enters the apartment by the balcony and wraps their hands around Jennifer’s throat, but flees when she screams. Marilyn thinks she imagined the encounter. The next morning at the drugstore, they meet their neighbor Sheila Issacs, who lives with the Professor, her father. 

Andrea is interviewed by the police as a potential suspect. Enci orders Renzi to keep watch on him. Jennifer finds a crushedplant near her door and enters the apartment, where Adam attacks her. She manages to escape and call Andrea. The two go out to eat and take a walk in a park, being followed by Renzi. 

Jennifer returns to the apartment that night to find the killer waiting, who attempts to kiss her. She hits them with a lamp and runs to Sheila’s apartment for help. When they go back together, the killer is gone. Marilyn arrives and finds a blood-soaked iris on the floor before opening a closet and discovering Adam, who's been stabbed to death.
Jennifer tells Enci and Renzi about the cult and they assure her she will not be charged in Adam’s death, blaming the murder on the masked killer. Later, she thinks she hears Mrs. Moss talking to a man in the apartment next door, but Marilyn thinks she is imagining it. A handwriting sample test comes back on Mizar's love letter, revealing it to have been sent by Sheila. Enci interviews her, and she comes out as a lesbian (she was also the one who hired Luna at the beginning of the film). 

Andrea invites Jennifer to his house, where he proclaims his love for her. The next day, Marilyn is stabbed in a crowd outside the high-rise by the killer. She manages to grab Andrea, who was waiting for a taxi nearby, before collapsing and dying. Frightened by the blood, he flees the scene and is chased by Renzi, but evades capture. Despite Enci’s suspicions, Jennifer is sure he is innocent of the murders.

She returns to the building and hears Mrs. Moss talking with the male voice again. She breaks into the neighboring apartment and is attacked by Mrs. Moss' son David, who is deformed. Mrs. Moss returns and yells at her before kicking her out. Jennifer calls the police, but Mrs. Moss has hidden David when they arrive and claims she lives alone. 

Jennifer receives a call from Andrea, who asks her to meet him in a junkyard outside of town. She goes there, but Andrea is scared off by Renzi, who followed her. Jennifer goes back to the apartment, runs into Sheila, and the two board the elevator together. However, it goes down to the basement by itself. They exit and explore the room before Sheila is burned to death by a jet of hot steam from a boiler sabotaged by the killer.

Jennifer hides as someone stalks her through the basement. Andrea reveals himself and claims his innocence, but she doesn’t believe his words. The police arrive and chase him, but he escapes. Meanwhile, Mrs. Moss finds David missing from his room. Professor Issacs is distraught over his daughter’s death and plays the violin in mourning. 

Jennifer decides to leave the apartment once and for all. While packing her bags, she is attacked by the killer again. She goes to Professor Issacs for help, only to find David’s dead body in a chair. The killer unlocks the door and takes off his mask, revealing himself as the Professor. Unable to cope with Sheila’s lesbianism, he blamed her sexuality on the other women in the building and murdered them for revenge. His disguise was inspired by David, who was under the mask in all the non-lethal appearances as a peeping tom on the building's women. He accidentally killed his daughter with the steam, thinking he was aiming at Jennifer. 

The Professor chloroforms her and throws David’s body down the open stairwell before preparing to do the same to her. Andrea exits the elevator and attacks, managing to overpower the Professor and throw him over the railing to his death. Him and Jennifer share a passionate hug, happy the ordeal is over.

Cast 
Edwige Fenech as Jennifer Langsbury
George Hilton as Andrea Antinori
Paola Quattrini as Marilyn Ricci
Annabella Incontrera as Sheila Issacs 
George Rigaud as Professor Isaacs
Giampiero Albertini as Commissioner Enci
Franco Agostini as Assistant Commissioner Renzi
Oreste Lionello as Arthur, the photographer
Ben Carrá as Adam
Carla Brait as Mizar Harrington
Luciano Pigozzi as Fanelli, the casino owner 
Maria Tedeschi as Mrs. Moss 
Evi Farinelli as Luna

Analysis and themes

Throughout the movie there is an underlying tone of sexual identity, the main protagonist of Jennifer is pursued by her sinister ex-husband Adam, a cult leader who demands absolute loyalty to him and believes Jennifer is simply part of the cult and refuses to respect her individual identity. Furthermore, the main antagonist Professor Isaacs is insanely jealous of his daughter Sheila's relationships with other women and believes that women have "corrupted" his daughter.

See also    
 List of Italian films of 1972

References

Bibliography

External links

1972 films
Giallo films
Films directed by Giuliano Carnimeo
1970s crime thriller films
Films produced by Luciano Martino
Films scored by Bruno Nicolai
1970s Italian films